The Aegon Pro-Series Loughborough is a tennis tournament that has been held in Loughborough, United Kingdom, since 2010. The event is part of the ITF Men's and ITF Women's Circuits and is played on indoor hardcourts. Until 2012, the tournament was part of the ATP Challenger Tour.

Past finals

Men's singles

Women's singles

Men's doubles

Women's doubles

External links
 Official website

ATP Challenger Tour
ITF Women's World Tennis Tour
 
Tennis tournaments in England
Hard court tennis tournaments
Sport in Loughborough
Recurring sporting events established in 2010